The following is a list of unproduced David Fincher projects in roughly chronological order. During his career, American film director David Fincher has worked on a number of projects which never progressed beyond the pre-production stage under his direction. Some of these projects fell in development hell, were officially canceled, were in development limbo or would see life under a different production team.

1990s

Madonna: Truth or Dare 

Alek Keshishian revealed in an interview that Fincher had been considered to direct, having already directed three music videos for Madonna. However, Fincher and Madonna would later have a falling out, and Keshishian was then attached as director.

The Sky Is Falling 
Fincher was set to direct the film, a spec script written by Howard Roth and Eric Warren Singer about two priests who engage in a killing spree after discovering God is nonexistent. The film would ultimately fail to obtain a green-light.

Blade 

In a 2004 interview with MovieWeb, David S. Goyer revealed that Fincher was attached to direct the first film at one point, and that he even developed the script with Goyer.

2000s

Passengers 
In January 2000, Fincher was announced to direct the film, an adaptation of Robert Silverberg's short story from 1969, for USA Films. Michael London would produce and Greg Pruss, who previously worked with Fincher on Alien 3 as a conceptual artist, was in charge of adapting the story. The budget was set to be no more than $30 million. In 2002, Ain't It Cool News reported that Fincher was no longer directing but would still produce and was scavenging for a director.

Catch Me If You Can 

In April 2000, Fincher was attached to direct Catch Me If You Can over the course of a few months, but dropped out in favor of Panic Room.

Chemical Pink 
Fincher acquired the right to Katie Arnoldi's novel that took place in the bodybuilding world, with Art Linson producing and Fight Club novelist Chuck Palahniuk writing the screenplay. Fincher eventually exited the project, with Jonas Åkerlund taking over as director. The project would become dormant.

Squids 
Fincher, along with Art Linson, purchased the script written by David Ayer in April 2000, a coming-of-age story set on a nuclear submarine during the Cold War. The film never developed further, and in 2012, Ayer spoke negatively on the script, stating it "sucked".

They Fought Alone 
Fincher entered discussions to direct the film in August 2000 about Col. Wendell Fertig, a soldier serving in the Philippines during World War II. The screenplay was written by William Nicholson. Fincher reiterated his intent to direct in January 2009, revealing Robert Towne had been brought in to rewrite the screenplay, and Brad Pitt was wanted to portray Fretig.

Seared 
In November 2000, Fincher was set to direct an adaptation of Anthony Bourdain's memoir Kitchen Confidential, which Art Linson would produce, and Brad Pitt reportedly interested to star as well as Benicio del Toro. The project was set to film once Fincher completed Panic Room. The book would instead be adapted for television as Kitchen Confidential starring Bradley Cooper as fictional version of Bourdain, which aired for one season in 2005, airing just four episodes.

Hard Boiled 
In 2001, Fincher was announced as directing an adaptation of Frank Miller's three issue comic book series that would see Nicolas Cage star in the lead role.

Rendezvous with Rama 
As early as 2001, Fincher was attached as director for an adaptation of the Arthur C. Clarke book, with Morgan Freeman attached to star. Fincher stated in 2007 he still planned to direct, but by 2008 he stated it was unlikely to be made as no script was written. Fincher reiterated his desire to still make the film in 2010, but it was still down to the matter of finding the right script. In an interview with Empire, in which Fincher was asked several questions by readers, he referred to the film as "a gigantic, expensive movie that didn't have any toys." In December 2021, it was announced Denis Villeneuve would direct the adaptation for Alcon Entertainment, with Freeman involved as producer.

Spider-Man 

Fincher was amongst several directors approached to direct an adaptation of the Marvel Comics character that would eventually be directed by Sam Raimi. Fincher described in a 2011 interview concepts he wanted to do in the film, such as a ten minute title sequence tackling Peter Parker's backstory and featuring Green Goblin killing Gwen Stacy.

Confessions of a Dangerous Mind 

In an interview with BBC, George Clooney revealed that Fincher was one of many directors considered to direct the film.

Mission: Impossible III 

In April 2002, Fincher was sought out by Tom Cruise to serve as director for the third instalment of the Mission: Impossible franchise. Fincher was looking to make the film “really violent”. However he would eventually pull out of the film, and said in a 2008 MTV interview “I think the problem with third movies is the people who are financing them are experts on how they should be made and what they should be. At that point, when you own a franchise like that, you want to get rid of any extraneous opinions. I'm not the kind of person who says, "Let's see the last two, I see what you're going for." You'll never hear me say, "Whatever is easiest for you”.

The Reincarnation of Peter Proud 
Fincher was reported to be in negotiations to direct a second adaptation of the 1974 novel for Paramount Pictures in May 2002. He officially became attached to direct in November 2009 with the remake rights now under Columbia Pictures. Andrew Kevin Walker was attached to write the screenplay, reuniting with Fincher since Seven. A different remake/adaptation was announced in 2021 as the first project under a new deal between Village Roadshow Pictures and David S. Goyer's Phantom Four Films to produce feature films. Sean Durkin is writing and directing the film.

Stay 

Fincher was reported to be directing David Benioff's spec-script in 2002, in a column written about Benioff. The film was eventually directed by Marc Forster and released in 2005.

Lords of Dogtown 

Fincher was hired to replace musician Fred Durst on the skateboarding biopic in January 2003, but exited over budget and philosophical differences with Sony Pictures. Catherine Hardwicke would eventually direct the final product.

The Lookout 

In August 2003, Fincher was reported to be directing the spec-script written by Scott Frank for DreamWorks Pictures. Fincher helped develop the script with Frank, and his contributions were later featured in the finished film. After Fincher dropped out, DreamWorks also abandoned the film, which was later picked up by Miramax and directed by Frank himself. The film was eventually released in 2007 to positive reviews.

The Black Dahlia 

Prior to the 2006 film version directed by Brian De Palma, Fincher was going to adapt James Ellroy's novel into a 5-part miniseries budgeted at $80 million that would star Tom Cruise. In 2013, a graphic novel adaptation was published with Fincher credited for adapting the story.

Torso 
Fincher was announced in 2006 to direct the adaptation of the Brian Michael Bendis and Marc Andreyko graphic of the same name about Eliot Ness and his investigation of the Cleveland Torso Murderer. Fincher indicated that the film would not be a very faithful adaptation of the comic. A cast of Matt Damon, Rachel McAdams, Casey Affleck and Gary Oldman was rumored to be attached prior to Paramount Pictures allowing the rights to the comic lapse in January 2009.

Black Hole 
In February 2008, Fincher was attached to direct Charles Burns's acclaimed graphic novel Black Hole for Plan B Entertainment. He officially dropped out in 2010 in order to direct The Girl with the Dragon Tattoo, although he was briefly reported to return in 2013. In 2018, it was reported that Rick Famuyiwa would direct the film, with New Regency financing.

Heavy Metal 
In March 2008, it was announced Fincher was to produce a remake of the 1981 film, itself based on the Heavy Metal magazine. It was planned to feature eight or nine segments, with Fincher, James Cameron, Zack Snyder, Kevin Eastman, Tim Miller and Mark Osborne directing segments, and Guillermo del Toro and Gore Verbinski reported as expressing interest in taking part as well. Tenacious D had written a song for the film, with Jack Black also set to appear in Osborne's segment.

The project was initially at Paramount Pictures, but was dropped by the studio in 2008. Eventually, Robert Rodriguez acquired the film rights to Heavy Metal, effectively cancelling Fincher's version.

The Automatic Detective 
Fincher acquired the rights to the A. Lee Martinez novel in July 2008, planning to make the film with Blur Studio.

Chef 

Fincher discussed in December 2008 a project he was looking to do set within the culinary arts world that would star Keanu Reeves. In 2010, the project was considered "dead". The film would eventually be released in 2015 as Burnt, directed by John Wells and starring Bradley Cooper.

2010s

20,000 Leagues Under the Sea 
It was announced by Fincher in 2010 that he was to direct a remake of the 1954 Disney film, with Scott Z. Burns writing the screenplay. Filming was initially planned to begin in late 2012, with Brad Pitt eyed to star. Pitt would decline the role, however. The production received a $20 million incentive to film in Australia, but Fincher would exit the project in July 2013, citing casting disagreements with Disney, as he wanted to cast Channing Tatum for the lead role, but Disney wanted Chris Hemsworth.

Cleopatra 
Fincher became attached to a new telling of the story of Cleopatra starring Angelina Jolie in March 2011. Fincher confirmed his involvement later that year, stating Eric Roth was working on the screenplay and that he wasn't looking to make it in a typical sword-and-sandal style.
 He left the project in August 2012.

The Girl Who Played with Fire 
Upon the December 2011 release of The Girl with the Dragon Tattoo, the American adaptation of the Stieg Larsson novel, Fincher revealed the plan was to make the sequels The Girl Who Played with Fire and The Girl Who Kicked the Hornets' Nest, "back to back." The script for Who Played with Fire was revised by Steven Zaillian and Andrew Kevin Walker at various stages. Upon the release of The Girl in the Spider's Web by David Lagercrantz, Sony Pictures elected to reboot the series instead with an adaptation of the new novel. It was released in 2018, directed by Fede Álvarez and starring Claire Foy. Fincher served as an executive producer.

Videosyncrazy 
In June 2015, HBO shut down production of this half-hour comedy series after it had filmed 4-5 episodes, with Fincher directing multiple episodes. It starred Charlie Rowe, Sam Page, Jason Flemyng, Kerry Condon, Elizabeth Lail, Corbin Bernsen and Paz Vega and was set in 1983, following a college dropout who moves to Hollywood with dreams of making a sci-fi epic, but ends up working on music videos. The first season was to begin with the making of the video for Berlin's song The Metro and would have concluded with the filming of Michael Jackson's Thriller. The series was written by Rich Wilkes and Bob Stephenson. Wilkes described it as “a half-hour show in the vein of something like Entourage or Veep.”

Utopia 

Fincher became interested in making an American remake of the British television series Utopia in July 2013. By February 2014, he teamed with author Gillian Flynn and began developing the series at HBO, which gave it a series order. Fincher was set to direct all the episodes of the show's first season, with Flynn writing. The series would have starred Rooney Mara, Colm Feore, Eric McCormack, Dallas Roberts, Jason Ritter, Brandon Scott, and Agyness Deyn. HBO cancelled the project in August 2015,due to budget issues. Fincher stated in an October 2017 interview that it was specifically a disagreement over $9 million. The series was picked up by Amazon Studios in 2018, with Flynn remaining onboard as creator, executive producer and showrunner. Along with Videosyncrazy and Utopia, the third series in the HBO deal, Shakedown a 50s-set noir series, was also halted.

Jobs 

Fincher entered early talks to direct a biopic about Apple Inc. co-founder Steve Jobs in February 2014. However he would bow out in April over contractual disputes.

Star Wars sequels 

In September 2014, Fincher revealed that he had discussed with Kathleen Kennedy a possible directing gig for Star Wars: Episode VII. His idea was to make it like The Empire Strikes Back, his favorite in the series, and that he saw the series as "the story of two slaves [ C-3PO and R2-D2 ] who go from owner to owner, witnessing their masters' folly, the ultimate folly of man." In a later interview with Empire, Fincher mentioned being offered to direct Episode IX, but turning it down as he found that he was not interested in "franchise filmmaking" due to the pressure of it all.

Strangers on a Train 
It was reported in January 2015 that Fincher was to re-team with Gone Girl actor Ben Affleck and screenwriter Gillian Flynn on a modern update of Alfred Hitchcock's 1951 film for Warner Bros. In a July 2015 interview, Flynn remarked all three individuals were "overcommitted" at the time.

World War Z 2 
Fincher was hired to direct the sequel to 2013's World War Z  in June 2017, with filming set to begin in June 2019. Paramount Pictures cancelled the project in February 2019. A cited reason for the cancellation was China imposing a ban on films featuring zombies and ghosts.

References

Fincher David